The Kipo Forest Reserve is in the Rufiji River Valley in Rufiji District, Pwani Region of eastern Tanzania, East Africa. It is protected under the 2002 Tanzania Forest Act and managed by the Forest and Beekeeping Division of the Ministry of Natural Resources and Tourism (MNRT) of Tanzania.

The estimate terrain elevation above sea level is 49 metres.

Notes

Protected areas of Tanzania
Forest reserves of Tanzania
Geography of Pwani Region